The Kunsthalle Praha is a private art museum for contemporary art that opened in February 2022. It is located in the Czech capital Prague. The museum is housed in a former cultural monument, the Zenger Transformation Station building. The director and CEO of the Kunsthalle Praha Foundation is Bulgarian Ivana Goossen.

The museum is supported by the non-profit Pudil Family Foundation, which wanted to create a platform with Kunsthalle Praha to promote the understanding and appreciation of Czech and international modern and contemporary art.

Name of the museum 
According to the Pudil Family Foundation, a conscious decision was made to use the German-language term “Kunsthalle“ in the name of the museum, on the one hand to refer to Prague's multicultural roots as a city of three nations and two languages, and on the other hand to point to Prague's cultural significance in the 19th and first half of the 20th century; where Czechs, Germans and the Jewish community lived together.

Collection mission, tasks and programme 
The museum has set itself the task of contributing to a better understanding of Czech and international art of the 20th and 21st centuries. Therefore, the museum is committed to established and emerging artists from Central Europe, as well as to discovering artistic trends and periods that are underrepresented or little known in the Czech Republic. The museum has also implemented its own artist-in-residence programme, in which international artists can participate.

The museum's task profile is based on three pillars:

 To present and contrast modern and contemporary art in a period from the end of the 19th century to the present.
 To explore the diversity of approaches of collectors of modern and contemporary art in the Czech Republic and elsewhere.
 To facilitate artistic encounters and discoveries, strengthen connections, promote exchanges and build partnerships with the art scenes and institutions of neighbouring countries, especially Austria, Germany.

The museum's collection of modern and contemporary art is still being built up. Among other things, the museum acquired the collection of artists from the Fluxus movement of the couple Maria and Milan Knížák and also took over the private art collection of Eva and Petr Zeman.

To realise its mission, the museum has developed an international programme of temporary exhibitions of modern and contemporary art and innovative educational activities.

Facilities 
The museum has a total floor space of approximately 5700 square metres. It includes exhibition spaces for 3 galleries, venues for educational programmes and other cultural and social events. A terrace on the roof of the building is open to the public as a viewing café. Other facilities include a bistro, a bookshop and a design store. Rooms for depots are located in the basement.

History of the building 
The Kunsthalle is located below Prague Castle on in the Malá Strana district. The building was originally constructed between 1930 and 1931 by the City of Prague Electricity Works as a transformer station. Previously, there was a barrack on the site. The design by architect Vilém Kvasnička was executed in the neoclassical style, which corresponds to the historical character of the area. The Transformation Station was named after the physicist and meteorologist Václav Zenger, a professor at the Czech Technical University in Prague.

The building was declared a cultural monument by the Czech Ministry of Culture in April 2015. The owner at the time then sold the building to a real estate company, which is a joint-stock company owned by Petr Pudil and his wife Pavlina. In 2016, the Pudil couple decided to convert the building into an art museum for their private art collection through their non-profit foundation, the Pudil Family Foundation.

The conversion and extension of the building was undertaken by the Prague-based project office Schindler Seko Architekti s.r.o.. During the reconstruction, the building was completely gutted, leaving only the perimeter walls of the original cultural monument.

On 31 October 2022, the reconstruction won the Czech National Architecture Award 2022.

Temporary exhibitions (selection) 

 2022, 22 February – 29 August: Kinetismus. 100 Years of Electricity in Art
 2022, 22 February – 30 May: The Zenger Transformer Station: Electricity in the City, Electricity in Architecture
 2022, 1 July – 30 September: Midnight of Art. Ways of Collecting: Karel Babíček’s Collection
 2022/2023, 18 December – 14 February: Jiří David. The Blue Heart
 2022/2023, 16 December – 8 January: Invisible Forces
 2022/2023, 28 September – 13 February: Gregor Hildebrandt. A Blink of an Eye and the Years are Behind Us

References

External links 
 Kunsthalle Praha on the pages of the Pudil Family Foundation 

Art museums and galleries in the Czech Republic
Museums in Prague